The 2019 Reinert Open was a professional tennis tournament played on outdoor clay courts. It was the twelfth edition of the tournament which was part of the 2019 ITF Women's World Tennis Tour. It took place in Versmold, Germany between 8 and 14 July 2019.

Singles main-draw entrants

Seeds

 1 Rankings are as of 1 July 2019.

Other entrants
The following players received wildcards into the singles main draw:
  Katharina Gerlach
  Jule Niemeier
  Julyette Steur
  Julia Wachaczyk

The following players received entry from the qualifying draw:
  Amina Anshba
  Nicoleta Dascălu
  Anastasia Dețiuc
  Cristiana Ferrando
  Ekaterina Makarova
  Teliana Pereira
  Chiara Scholl
  Anastasiya Shoshyna

Champions

Singles

 Nina Stojanović def.  Katharina Hobgarski, 6–0, 7–5

Doubles

 Amina Anshba /  Anastasia Dețiuc def.  Ankita Raina /  Bibiane Schoofs, 0–6, 6–3, [10–8]

References

External links
 2019 Reinert Open at ITFtennis.com
 Official website

2019 ITF Women's World Tennis Tour
2019 in German tennis
Reinert Open
2012 in German women's sport